African Head Charge is a psychedelic dub ensemble active since the early 1980s. The group was formed by percussionist Bonjo Iyabinghi Noah, and featured a revolving cast of members, including Prisoner, Nick Plytas, Crocodile, Junior Moses, Sunny Akpan, Skip McDonald, Gaudi and Jah Wobble. The group released most of its albums on Adrian Sherwood's label, On-U Sound.

Journalist David Stubbs, writing in The Wire, said, "The notion of African Head Charge was hatched when Adrian Sherwood read Brian Eno's comment about his vision for a 'psychedelic Africa.

Many of their early albums have been re-released as double albums on CD.

Discography
My Life in a Hole in the Ground (On-U Sound, 1981)
Environmental Studies (On-U Sound, 1982)
Drastic Season (On-U Sound, 1983)
Off the Beaten Track (On-U Sound, 1986 Anthology Recordings, 2006)
Great Vintage Volumes 1 & 2 (On-U Sound, 1989) (compilation)
Songs of Praise (On-U Sound, 1990)
Live:Pride and Joy (On-U Sound, 1991)
In Pursuit of Shashamane Land (On-U Sound, ON-U LP65, 1993)
All Mighty Dread (Beat Records, 1994) (compilation)
Touch I EP (On-U Sound, 1994)
Akwaaba (Acid Jazz Records, 1995)
Sankofa (Bonjo I, 1997)
Drums Of Defiance: African Head Charge Versus Professor Stretch  (On-U Sound, ON-ULP93, 1998) 
Noah House of Dread (Bonjo I, 1998)
Live Goodies (Bonjo I, 2001)
Shrunken Head (On-U Sound, 2003) (compilation)
Vision of a Psychedelic Africa (On-U Sound, 2005)
In Charge:Live in Japan EP (On-U Sound, 2005)
Voodoo of The Godsent (On-U Sound, 2011)
Return Of The Crocodile (On-U Sound, 2016)
Churchical Chant Of The Iyabinghi (On-U Sound, 2020)

References

External links
African Head Charge Official Website
[ African Head Charge] at Allmusic.com

Reggae musical groups
On-U Sound Records artists